The first newspaper in Iraq was Journal Iraq published by Ottoman Wali, Dawud Pasha, in Baghdad in 1816.

This is a list of newspapers in Iraq.

A–G

 Al Anbaa (Fallujah)
 Al Hawza (defunct)
Al-Mada
Al-Mashriq
 Al-Mustaqilla (Baghdad; defunct)
Al-Mutamar
 Al-Sabaah
 Awena (Iraqi Kurdistan)
 Azzaman
 Babel
Bahra
 Bashira (Fallujah; defunct)
Ath-Thawra (Ba'athist Iraq;Disbanded after 2003)

H–Z

 Hawlati (Iraqi Kurdistan)
Iraq Today (English)
 Iraq World (Baghdad)
 Iraqi News (iraqinews.com)
 Karbala News (Karbala)
 Ktabat (kitabat.com)
The Kurdish Globe
 Renwen (Khanaqin, Iraqi Kurdistan)
 Rozhnama (Iraqi Kurdistan)
SOMA Digest (English)
 Sot al-Iraq (sotaliraq.com)
 Xebat (Kurdistan)

References

External links
 Al-Bab Iraqi press after 2003
Newspapers from Iraq
 English translations of articles about and from Iraq available through nonprofit WorldMeets.US

Newspapers
Iraq